René Twardzik (born 25 June 1970) is a Czech former professional footballer who played as a goalkeeper.

Career

Club career
Born in Třinec, Twardzik played for TZ Třinec, Slavia Prague, VTJ Tábor, VTJ Karlovy Vary, Boby Brno, FC Vítkovice, Opava, Sachsen Leipzig and FC Rot-Weiß Erfurt. Twardzik played four matches for Czechoslovakia U21.

Later career
He became the goalkeeping coach of FC Rot-Weiß Erfurt in July 2010. From September 2018 to November 2018, Twardzik sat on the bench for FC Rot-Weiß Erfurt for five games due to injuries. At the end of January 2020, the club ceased operations due to financial difficulties, and as a result, withdrew from the Regionalliga Nordost. The day after, he was released by the club.

Personal life
His sons Dan, Filip and Patrik are also all professional footballers.  he has lived in Germany for 15 years.

References

1970 births
Living people
Czech footballers
Czech expatriate footballers
Czech expatriate sportspeople in Germany
Expatriate footballers in Germany
Association football goalkeepers
FK Fotbal Třinec players
SK Slavia Prague players
FC Zbrojovka Brno players
MFK Vítkovice players
SFC Opava players
FC Sachsen Leipzig players
FC Rot-Weiß Erfurt players
Czech First League players
2. Bundesliga players
Czechoslovakia under-21 international footballers
Czechoslovak footballers
Sportspeople from Třinec